Tsegihi is a bright region in Titan's southern mid-latitudes.  It is centered at 

Tsegihi is named for a sacred place of the Navajo. The first line in the Navajo Nightsong Tsegihi, The House Made of Dawn runs:

 In Tsegihi, oh you who dwell
 In the house made of the dawn...

References

Surface features of Titan (moon)